Sakutumba Saparivaara Sametam ( Whole Family Together) is a 2000 Telugu-language drama film, produced by V. M. D. Reddy, M. Mohan Gandhi Reddy and directed by S. V. Krishna Reddy. It stars Akkineni Nageswara Rao, Srikanth, Seema, Ravi Teja  and music composed by S. V. Krishna Reddy.

Plot
Vamsi (Srikanth) a middle-class bank employee, has a disorganized family where everyone is flawed, drunkard father (Kota Srinivasa Rao), shrew mother (Y. Vijaya), gambler brother (Maharshi Raghava), selfish sister (Rajitha) and lazy brother-in-law (Brahmanandam).  The exclusive that showers endearment on Vamsi is his sister-in-law Vani (Suhasini) whom he respects as a mother. Disgusted Vamsi decides not to marry but after getting acquainted with a girl Vasanti (Seema) he falls in love. Here Vasanti asks him to take acceptance from her grandfather Janaki Ramaiah (Akkineni Nageswara Rao) a lead-off person in a village. Immediately, Vamsi moves to Janaki Ramaiah along with his close friend Ravi (Ravi Teja) and explains the situation. There, Janaki Ramaiah starts revealing the past that he has performed a rich alliance with his daughter (Priya) but unfortunately, they tormented which led to her death. Hence Janaki Ramaiah decides to send Vasanti into an ideal family. Knowing it, Ravi poses Vamsi's family as optimal to make his friend's love successful. Right now, Janaki Ramaiah keeps a condition that he is going to stay with the family for a month to study them. Listening to it, Vamsi lures his family members with money and arranges for them to act as genuine for 1 month. Janaki Ramaiah arrives and during this time the love and affection blossom between them. Ultimately, Janaki Ramaiah gives his approval and makes the wedding arrangements. But Vamsi is not ready to bow to this betrayal, so, he presents the promised amount to his family members, reaches Janaki Ramaiah, and reveals the truth. Surprisingly, Janaki Ramaiah proclaims that he has realized it at the beginning itself but at the request of Vani he stayed back to reform the family. At last, Vamsi's family members too repent for their deeds and plead with Vamsi to agree to espousal. Finally, the movie ends on a happy note with the marriage of Vamsi and Vasanti.

Cast

Soundtrack

Music composed by S. V. Krishna Reddy. Lyrics were written by Suddala Ashok Teja. Music released on HMV Audio Company.

Awards
Nandi Awards -2000
Best Director — S. V. Krishna Reddy
Best Home Viewing Feature Film - M. Mohan Gandhi Reddy

References

External links
http://www.raaga.com/channels/telugu/album/A0002315.html

2000 films
2000s Telugu-language films
Indian drama films
Indian family films
Films directed by S. V. Krishna Reddy
Films scored by S. V. Krishna Reddy